The Palazzo d'Aquino di Caramanico in central Naples, Italy, is a Palace located on via Medina in the Quartiere San Giuseppe of Rione Carita. It is flanked by the contemporary Palazzo Giordano and two doors down from the tall modern NH Ambassador Hotel. 

The Rococo architect Ferdinando Fuga worked on construction during 1775 and 1780 of this palace (and played a large role in the design of the adjacent Palazzo Giordano. The interior was frescoed by Giovanni Funaro and Nicola Malinconico. During 1927, the palace became offices of the Fascist party.

References

Palaces in Naples
Baroque architecture in Naples
Buildings and structures completed in 1780
1780 establishments in Italy
18th-century architecture in Italy